Todd Stansbury is a Canadian–American university sports administrator and former college athlete. Stansbury is the former athletic director for the Georgia Tech Yellow Jackets sports program at the Georgia Institute of Technology.  He previously served as executive associate athletic director at Oregon State, assistant athletic director for academics at Georgia Tech, associate athletic director at the University of Houston, and athletic director at East Tennessee State University, the University of Central Florida, and the Georgia Institute of Technology.

Early life and education
Stansbury was born in Oakville, Ontario, Canada. He accepted an athletic scholarship to attend the Georgia Tech in Atlanta, Georgia, where he lettered as a linebacker for coach Bill Curry's Yellow Jackets football team. He graduated from Georgia Tech with a B.S. in Industrial Management in 1984, and was a third round draft choice for the Saskatchewan Roughriders. In 1993, he graduated with a masters in sports administration from Georgia State University.

Athletic administrator
Stansbury began his career at his alma mater, as an academic counselor for football in 1988, rising to become assistant athletic director for academics at Georgia Tech. In 1995, he left Georgia Tech to become the international coordinator for the Institute for International Sport. Upon returning to the United States, he accepted the position of associate athletic director at the University of Houston in 1997. Stansbury was hired as the Director of Athletics at East Tennessee State University in July 2000.

In January 2012, he was hired as the athletic director of the UCF Knights. He served as the executive vice president for the University of Central Florida Athletics Association, the private non-profit corporation that is responsible for the administration and financial management of the UCF Knights athletic programs. As UCF's director of athletics, Stansbury oversaw the Knights transition from Conference USA to the American Athletic Conference in 2013, and directed over $70 million in athletic facility construction and upgrades. In June 2015, Stansbury announced that he would accept the same position at Oregon State. In September 2016, Georgia Tech announced that they had hired Stansbury for the same position.

In January 2023, he was hired as the deputy athletic director for internal operations as well as the football sport supervisor at NC State.

References

Living people
Canadian football linebackers
East Tennessee State Buccaneers athletic directors
Georgia Tech Yellow Jackets football players
Oregon State Beavers athletic directors
UCF Knights athletic directors
Georgia State University alumni
People from Oakville, Ontario
College Football Playoff Selection Committee members
1961 births